There have been two baronetcies created for members of the Cust family, one in the Baronetage of England and one in the Baronetage of the United Kingdom.

The Cust Baronetcy, "of Stamford in the County of Lincoln", was created in the Baronetage of England on 29 September 1677 for Richard Cust. The fourth holder of this creation was elevated to the peerage as Baron Brownlow in 1776 (see that title for more information).

The Cust Baronetcy, "of Leasowe Castle in the County of Chester", was created in the Baronetage of the United Kingdom on 26 February 1876 for Sir Edward Cust, Kt., KCH. He was the younger son of Brownlow Cust, 1st Baron Brownlow, and had earlier represented Grantham and Lostwithiel in the House of Commons. The title became extinct on the death of the first Baronet's grandson, the third Baronet, in 1931.

Cust baronets, of Stamford (1677)
see Baron Brownlow

Cust baronets, of Leasowe Castle (1876)
Sir Edward Cust, Kt., KCH, 1st Baronet (1794–1878)
Sir Leopold Cust, 2nd Baronet (1831–1878)
Sir Charles Leopold Cust, 3rd Baronet (1864–1931)

See also
Leasowe Castle

Notes

References

Further reading
Cust, Lady Elizabeth, Records of the Cust Family of Pinchbeck, Stamford and Belton in Lincolnshire, 1479-1700, London, 1898 

Baronetcies in the Baronetage of England
Extinct baronetcies in the Baronetage of the United Kingdom
1677 establishments in England
1876 establishments in the United Kingdom
Baronets